Verino may refer to

 Claudio Verino, an Argentine footballer
 Verino airfield, a Soviet Air Force airfield